Georgia State Route 7 Spur may refer to:

 Georgia State Route 7 Spur (Perry), a short spur route of State Route 7 in Perry
 Georgia State Route 7 Spur (Valdosta), a short former spur route of State Route 7 in Valdosta